John Abbott Ferguson (born 4 June 1944) is an Australian competitive sailor. He competed at the 1968 Summer Olympics in Mexico City, in the dragon class.

References

External link
 
 
 

1944 births
Living people
Australian male sailors (sport)
Olympic sailors of Australia
Sailors at the 1968 Summer Olympics – Dragon
20th-century Australian people